Hagigat or Haghighat is a name that may refer to:

Fariborz Haghighat (born 1951), Canadian academic
Hagigat Rzayeva (1907–1969), Azerbaijani actress and singer
Nahid Hagigat (born 1943), Iranian-American illustrator and artist

Arabic-language surnames
Persian-language surnames